Israel Railways Ltd. (Rakevet Yisra'el), is the state-owned principal railway company responsible for all inter-city, commuter, and freight rail transport in Israel. All its lines are standard gauge. The network is centered in Israel's densely populated coastal plain, from which lines radiate out in many directions. In 2018, Israel Railways carried 68 million passengers.

Unlike road vehicles and city trams, Israeli heavy rail trains run on the left hand tracks, matching neighboring Egypt and other Middle Eastern countries, whose formerly connected rail networks were constructed by British engineers.

Until 1980, the company's head office was located at Haifa Center HaShmona railway station. Tzvi Tzafriri, the general manager of Israel Railways, decided to move the head office to Tel Aviv Savidor Central Railway Station. In 2017, the company's head office was moved to a new campus built on the grounds of the Lod railway station.

Stations
There are 66 stations on the Israel Railways network, with almost all of the stations being accessible to disabled persons, with public announcement and passenger information systems, vending machines and parking.

Bicycle policy
Bicycles are permitted on the train in designated coaches.

Israel Railways encourage people to use bicycles by building a double-deck parking for bicycles in every train station and by allowing people to take the bike with them on the train to minimize the need for private cars.

Smoking
In Israel, smoking is prohibited in public enclosed places or commercial areas. Although smoking in railway stations is allowed at designated zones of the station, the sale of tobacco from automated vending machines is prohibited.

List of stations

Lines 

Israel Railways currently operates 15 passenger service lines. These can be broadly subdivided into inter-city lines, which connect two or more of Israel's major metropolitan centres (Tel Aviv, Jerusalem, Haifa, and Beersheba), usually skipping some of the intermediate stations, and commuter lines, centered on one metropolitan area and serving all stations on the line. However, Israel Railways no longer officially uses this classification.

Some services were partially or fully suspended as a result of the COVID-19 pandemic and electrification works.

Inter-city lines

Commuter lines

† Fully electrified line
‡ Line electrification in progress

Future 

The flagship project of Israel Railways is the construction of an improved rail line from Tel Aviv to Jerusalem. The line began as an extension of the current railway to Ben Gurion Airport and Modi'in, and terminates in a new underground station beside the Jerusalem Central Bus Station. An additional proposal will connect Modi'in to Jerusalem if built by connecting to the aforementioned line. The project of electrification, starting with the new Jerusalem-Tel Aviv line is ongoing with plans to eventually electrify all or most of the network.

A  line from the city of Acre, on the Mediterranean coast, to Karmiel was completed in March 2017. However, this tract bypasses Acre and does not make a stop there ; it is planned to be extended north to the north-eastern town of Qiryat Shemona, with future stations also planned for Jadeidi-Makr and Majd al-Krum, though there is no timetable for construction. This line will be fully electrified.

There were plans to build a high-speed railway to Eilat. In 2019 the project has been indefinitely frozen.

This was completed in 2016. There has been talk of further extending the line to Irbid, in Jordan (to allow a direct freight connection from Jordan to the Mediterranean Sea); however, no decision has yet been made on this matter. Another proposed extension under discussion would connect the reconstructed Jezreel Valley railway at Afula to Tiberias.

In May 2017, an extension of the railway from Arad via Kuseife was approved.  The line would connect to the existing Beersheba–Dimona rail line at the proposed new station at Nevatim.

Rolling stock

Current

Locomotives

Multiple Units

Carriages

Retired

Locomotives

Steam Locomotives

Diesel Locomotives

Multiple Units

Carriages

Organizational structure 

In 2017, Israel Railways founded a Tunnels Unit that is responsible for the daily operation of railway tunnels, including lighting, air circulation, etc. and managing emergencies.

Performance 
The passenger number history is as follows:

 In contemporary shekels – not adjusted for inflation

Notable accidents 
On 26 December 1963 two passenger trains on the then single-track main line linking Tel Aviv and Haifa collided head-on at Bet Yehoshua just south of Netanya. The northbound train had passed a red signal and its locomotive rode over and crushed the locomotive of the southbound train. None of the coaches was derailed but a coupler broke in the northbound train detaching the rear three coaches. The continuous train brake should have then automatically stopped the detached coaches but it had not been connected properly so they started to roll back southwards. 55 people were injured but only three seriously enough to be detained in hospital. The two head-end crews survived but their locomotives, EMD G12s 105 and 118, were destroyed.
HaBonim disaster: On 11 June 1985 a train collided with a bus carrying school children, killing 19 children and 3 adults, near moshav HaBonim.
On 21 June 2005 an IC3 train crashed into a freight truck near kibbutz Revadim, killing 8 and injuring 198.
8 July 2005, a train collided with a truck between Kiryat Gat and Ahuzam, resulting in the death of the train driver and 38 injuries. In February 2012 a plea bargain had been set for the Revadim crash.
On 12 June 2006 a train crashed into a truck near Beit Yehoshua, killing 5 and injuring from 77 to over 80.
On 27 December 2009 a train crashed into a car near Kiryat Gat. The driver proceeded without regard to the train checkpoint on the road. The train struck his car and he was killed.
On 5 August 2010 a train crashed into a minibus near Kiryat Gat, killing 7 and injuring 6. The minibus was hit at 19:05 GMT+3 on Route 353, apparently as it tried to pass over a level crossing.
On 28 December 2010 a fire started in a train near kibbutz Yakum, probably because of a short circuit, injuring 116.
On 7 April 2011 two trains collided frontally near Netanya, injuring 59.
On 4 October 2013, two men walking along railroad tracks in the Emek Hefer valley industrial zone were killed by a train.
On 18 December 2013, a Beersheba-bound train collided with a group of camels walking along railroad tracks at the Segev Shalom Junction in the Negev, killing 14 camels. The incident caused massive delays in train traffic.
On 29 December 2013, an Israel Railways worker was run down and killed by a train near Lod.
On 15 March 2016, an Israel Railways locomotive crashed into freight wagons, injuring 6.

See also

 Rail transport in Israel
 Hejaz Railway (1908-1920), Ottoman line which connected Damascus with Medina; the Jezreel Valley railway was a branch in its network
Ottoman Palestine railways
 Eastern Railway, Ottoman WWI line, Tulkarm to Hadera and Tulkarm to Lydda; connected to Jezreel Valley, Jaffa–Jerusalem, and Beersheba lines
 Jaffa–Jerusalem railway (inaugurated 1892)
 Jezreel Valley railway (1905-1948), segment of the Haifa–Dera'a Line which connected the Hejaz Railway to the port of Haifa
 Railway to Beersheba or the 'Egyptian Branch', Ottoman WWI line headed towards the Suez Canal; two lines: (Lidda–) Wadi Surar (Nahal Soreq)–Beit Hanoun, and Wadi Surar–Beersheba
Mandate Palestine & Israel railways
 Palestine Railways, government-owned company and rail monopolist in Mandate Palestine (1920-1948)
 Coastal railway line, main line in Mandate Palestine and Israel

Bibliography

References

External links 

 
 

Government-owned companies of Israel
Railway companies of Israel
Railway companies established in 1948
Israeli brands